Tyron Jerrar Smith (born December 12, 1990) is an American football offensive tackle for the Dallas Cowboys of the National Football League (NFL). He played college football at USC where he won the Morris Trophy, recognizing the best offensive and defensive linemen on the West Coast, in 2010. Smith was drafted by the Cowboys with the ninth overall pick in the 2011 NFL Draft.

High school career
Smith attended Rancho Verde High School in Moreno Valley, California, where he played on the offensive and defensive line. He earned All-American honors by Parade, SuperPrep, PrepStar, Scout.com, and EA Sports, while also receiving numerous other All-Region honors. As a junior in 2006, he made Cal-Hi Sports All-State Underclass second team, All-CIF Central Division first team, and Riverside Press-Enterprise All-Riverside County second team. Smith played in the 2008 U.S. Army All-American Bowl. Also a standout in track & field at Rancho Verde, Smith notched top-throws of 14.23 meters (46 feet, 7 inches) in the shot put and 46.62 meters (152 feet, 10 inches) in the discus.

Considered a five-star recruit and described as "an amazing right tackle prospect" by Rivals.com, Smith was ranked as the No. 6 offensive tackle prospect. Scout.com, who also viewed Smith as a five-star recruit, listed him as the No. 1 offensive tackle prospect in the nation.

College career
Smith played three seasons with the USC Trojans from 2008 to 2010. As a freshman, he was the backup left offensive tackle. He appeared in 10 games. As a sophomore, he started the first twelve games at right offensive tackle. He earned All-Pac-10 honorable mention and CollegeFootballNews.com Sophomore All-American honorable mention for the 2009 season. As a junior, he appeared in twelve games.

Professional career

2011 NFL Draft
Smith was considered one of the top offensive tackle prospects in the 2011 NFL Draft, along with Gabe Carimi, Anthony Castonzo, and Nate Solder. Selected by the Dallas Cowboys with the ninth overall pick, he was the first offensive lineman drafted in the first round by the Cowboys since Jerry Jones bought the team in 1989, and the highest in franchise history since John Niland went fifth overall in 1966. He signed a four-year, $12.5 million contract.

Dallas Cowboys

2011 season
Entering the league as a 20-year-old rookie, Smith was named a starter at right tackle from the first day of Organized Team Activities, with Doug Free taking over the left tackle spot. His role became even more important after the Cowboys released veteran offensive linemen Marc Colombo, Leonard Davis, Andre Gurode, and Montrae Holland during the preseason. Smith started every game and earned praise for his play, prompting the media to speculate on a possible move to left tackle in the next season. He was named to the NFL All-Rookie Team.

2012 season
Starting the 2012 season, Smith switched to starting left tackle, switching sides on the offensive line with Free. On September 12, Smith was fined $15,000 for a horse-collar tackle he did during the season opener against the New York Giants. However, little celebrated was the fact that the tackle was touchdown-saving coming after an interception, which led to a goal line stand by the Dallas defense. He started 15 games for the Cowboys in the 2012 season.

2013 season
In his third year with the Cowboys, Smith committed just one holding penalty and allowed only one sack in his 16 starts. He was named to the 2014 Pro Bowl on Team Rice. He was ranked 78th by his fellow players on the NFL Top 100 Players of 2014.

2014 season

Smith signed an eight-year, $109 million contract extension with the Cowboys in July, making him the highest-paid offensive lineman in the league at the time. He was widely considered one of the top three offensive tackles in the league, and for his play against the Seattle Seahawks, he became the first offensive lineman in 10 years to be named Offensive Player of the Week. He started all 16 games for the NFL's second ranked rushing offense, while helping DeMarco Murray become the league's rushing leader. He was ranked 36th by his fellow players on the NFL Top 100 Players of 2015.

2015 season
Smith started all 16 games, helped clear the way for the NFL's fourth leading rusher (Darren McFadden) and earned his third Pro Bowl selection. He was ranked 42nd by his fellow players on the NFL Top 100 Players of 2016.

2016 season
Forced to play through nagging injuries throughout the season, Smith helped lead the Cowboys to a 13–3 record, and aided rookie Ezekiel Elliott in becoming the league's leading rusher. Smith was named the first team left tackle for the 2016 All-Pro Team, the second time he carried this honor in his career. He was named to his fourth consecutive Pro Bowl and was named First-team All-Pro, both honors being shared with fellow Cowboy offensive linemen Travis Frederick and Zack Martin. He was ranked 18th by his peers on the NFL Top 100 Players of 2017 as the highest ranked offensive lineman.

2017 season

Smith was named to his fifth straight Pro Bowl alongside guard Zack Martin and center Travis Frederick for the second straight year. Smith's 2017 season was marred by multiple injuries, which included to his knee, back, groin, and hip. He started and played in 13 games. He was placed on injured reserve on December 29, meaning that he would not play in the season finale against the Philadelphia Eagles. He was  ranked 39th by his fellow players on the NFL Top 100 Players of 2018.

2018 season
Smith started 13 games at left tackle, missing three with injury, on his way to his sixth straight Pro Bowl. He was ranked 52nd by active NFL players on the NFL Top 100 Players of 2019.

2019 season
Smith started 13 games at left tackle in 2019. He earned a solid 76.5 grade from PFF and was marked with 8 penalties; however, he only allowed 1 sack. This led to his 7th straight Pro Bowl selection since 2013. He was named #78 on the NFL Top 100 Players of 2020.

2020 season
In 2020, Smith had been bothered by a neck issue spanning within the past years. On October 9, Smith announced that he would forgo the rest of the 2020 season after choosing to have surgery on his neck. He was subsequently placed on the injured reserve.

2021 season
Smith suffered multiple ankle injuries that lingered throughout the season. Smith missed Weeks 9, 10, 11, 12, 15, and 16 due to the injuries.

2022 season
Smith suffered a torn hamstring in practice during training camp. He was placed on injured reserve on August 31, 2022. He was activated on December 17. Smith moved to Right Tackle with the emergence of Tyler Smith.

Personal life
Smith has one son, Jaxson.

References

External links
 
USC Trojans bio
Dallas Cowboys bio

1990 births
Living people
Sportspeople from Riverside County, California
People from Moreno Valley, California
Players of American football from California
American football offensive tackles
USC Trojans football players
Dallas Cowboys players
Unconferenced Pro Bowl players
National Conference Pro Bowl players